Michaël Benyahia (born July 21, 2000, in Miami) is a Moroccan racing driver.

Career

Early career 
Benyahia was born in Miami of a Moroccan father and a Belgian mother. His father, Karim Benyahia is a businessman in hands-free technologies. His mother, Pascale Van Cleemput was Honorary consul of Belgium in Miami between 2002 and 2005.

Benyahia began karting in 2007 at the age of seven, claiming numerous titles in his career.

In November 2013, he took part in the Rotax Max Challenge Grand Finals held in New Orleans where he finished sixth of the Mini Max category.

Lower formulae 
In 2015, Benyahia graduated to single-seaters in the French F4 Championship, where he earned nine points and finished 17th. The following year he repeated this series, finishing 3rd and claiming a victory and six podiums.

Formula Renault 
Michael signed with the R-ace GP Team and became 2017 Formula Renault FR 2.0 NEC Champion. As part of his prize for becoming the 2017 champion at Hockenheim, Michael Benyahia paid a visit to Renault Sport's F1 facility at Enstone.

Formula 3 
Between June and October 2019, he joined the development program of the British team Carlin Motorsport to prepare for a serie in F3.

Formula E 
In September 2017, Benyahia joined Venturi Formula E Team as Development Driver, one month later he took part in the pre-season test session in Valencia, then in January 2018 at the Rookie Test of the Marrakesh ePrix where he was the youngest among the twenty participants, in which he finished 19th in the first session and 18th in the second.

British GT  
Benyahia is one of four confirmed drivers that will drive two McLaren 570S GT4s for Tolman Motorsport for the 2020 season, after he, Katie Milner, Harry Hayek and Alain Valente were the top 4 drivers in an 18-driver selection at Snetterton.

Racing record

Career summary

† As Benyahia was a guest driver, he was ineligible for points.

Complete British GT Championship results
(key) (Races in bold indicate pole position in class) (Races in italics indicate fastest lap in class)

References

External links
 
 

2000 births
Living people
Moroccan racing drivers
French F4 Championship drivers
Formula Renault 2.0 NEC drivers
American people of Moroccan descent
Euroformula Open Championship drivers
British GT Championship drivers
Formula Renault Eurocup drivers
Auto Sport Academy drivers
R-ace GP drivers
RP Motorsport drivers
International GT Open drivers
Racing drivers from Miami
FIA Motorsport Games drivers
GT4 European Series drivers